Morten Pedersen (born 12 April 1972) is a Norwegian former footballer who played as defender. He is the head coach of Tromsø under 21 side.

Career
Pedersen started his career playing for Storsteinnes IL, before going to the Danish club Brøndby IF in 1990. His stint at Brøndby was not successful, and he only got to play one match during the two years he stayed at the club. In 1992, he returned to Norway to play for Tromsø. Pedersen stayed with Tromsø until 1996, when he transferred to Brann. Pedersen only spent one year, playing regularly for Brann, before trying his luck abroad for a second time, this time with German Bundesliga club Borussia Mönchengladbach. His career in Germany proved to be as unsuccessful as his career in Denmark, however, and he returned to Norway one year later to play with Rosenborg, where he won the Tippeligaen. After a year at Rosenborg, he made a third and final attempt at establishing a career as a foreign professional, going to Belgian side Gent. At Gent, which at that moment was coached by a fellow Norwegian, Trond Sollied, Pedersen finally got regular playing time, and his time at the club proved very successful. Pedersen played with Gent for some seasons before returning to Tromsø in 2003, the same year that Ole Martin Årst also returned to Tromsø from Belgium. Pedersen was during his playing career heavily linked to both Liverpool and Newcastle United.

Pedersen also played for Vålerenga for a while, on a loan.

Before retiring in 2007, Pedersen played for Tromsø, where he returned in 2003 after having played for various professional Norwegian and foreign clubs. During Tromsø's last home match of the 2006 season, Pedersen sustained an injury which would eventually lead him to retire from football. He officially announced that he retired in August 2007, and was honored during a special ceremony before the home match against Odd Grenland on 2 September 2007.

From 2009 through 2010 he was the head coach of Tromsdalen UIL.

References

Living people
1972 births
Sportspeople from Tromsø
Association football defenders
Norwegian footballers
Brøndby IF players
Tromsø IL players
SK Brann players
Borussia Mönchengladbach players
Rosenborg BK players
Vålerenga Fotball players
K.A.A. Gent players
Eliteserien players
Bundesliga players
Belgian Pro League players
Norwegian expatriate footballers
Expatriate footballers in Belgium
Expatriate men's footballers in Denmark
Expatriate footballers in Germany
Norwegian expatriate sportspeople in Belgium
Norwegian expatriate sportspeople in Denmark
Norwegian expatriate sportspeople in Germany
Norwegian football managers